Eimear Ann Jermyn Richardson (born 14 September 1986) is an Irish cricketer who plays as a right-handed batter and right-arm off break bowler. She plays domestic cricket for Northern Districts, having previously played for Central Districts and Wellington in New Zealand and Typhoons in Ireland.

In June 2018, she was named in Ireland's squad for the 2018 ICC Women's World Twenty20 Qualifier tournament. In October 2018, she was named in Ireland's squad for the 2018 ICC Women's World Twenty20 tournament in the West Indies.

In August 2019, she was named in Ireland's squad for the 2019 ICC Women's World Twenty20 Qualifier tournament in Scotland. She was the leading wicket-taker for Ireland in the tournament, with nine dismissals in five matches. In July 2020, she was awarded a non-retainer contract by Cricket Ireland for the following year. In August 2021, she was named the player of the tournament in the 2021 ICC Women's T20 World Cup Europe Qualifier in Spain. In November 2021, she was named in Ireland's team for the 2021 Women's Cricket World Cup Qualifier tournament in Zimbabwe.

References

External links

1986 births
Living people
Irish women cricketers
Ireland women One Day International cricketers
Ireland women Twenty20 International cricketers
Cricketers from Dublin (city)
Central Districts Hinds cricketers
Wellington Blaze cricketers
Northern Districts women cricketers
Typhoons (women's cricket) cricketers
Scorchers (women's cricket) cricketers